Mariamar is an album by the jazz saxophonist Archie Shepp recorded in Rome, Italy, on October 16, 1975, and released on the Horo label.

Track listing
All compositions by Archie Shepp
 "The Magic"
 "Shepp's Mood"
 "Mariamar"
 "Tres Ideias"
Recorded in Rome, Italy on October 16, 1975

Personnel
Archie Shepp - tenor saxophone, soprano saxophone, piano
Charles Greenlee - trombone
Alessio Urso - double bass
Afonso Vieira - drums
Cicci Santucci - trumpet
Irio De Paula - guitar

References

1976 albums
Archie Shepp albums
Horo Records albums